Manduca johanni is a moth of the  family Sphingidae. It is known from Haiti and the Dominican Republic.

The wingspan is about 115 mm. Adults have been recorded in May and June.

References

Manduca
Moths described in 1958